Zamia urep is a species of plant in the family Zamiaceae. It is endemic to Yuyapichis District (also spelled Llullapichis), Pachitea Province, Huanuco Region, Peru.  It is threatened by habitat loss.

References

Flora of Peru
urep
Critically endangered plants
Taxonomy articles created by Polbot